= The Daughter of the Dragon =

Australian radio drama

- Genre: musical comedy
- Running time: 60 mins (8:10 pm – 9:10 pm)
- Country of origin: Australia
- Language: English
- Syndicates: ABC
- Written by: Muriel Leslie; D. Bowes Kelley
- Directed by: Russell Scott
- Recording studio: Sydney
- Original release: 19 April 1938

The Daughter of the Dragon is a 1938 Australian musical radio drama with music by Frederick Whaite, who worked for the ABC. It was a light musical comedy, set in China. Book and lyrics were by Muriel Leslie and D. Bowes Kelley.

The show was played again in 1939.

== Premise ==
According to Wireless Weekly, "It was the first day of the “Feast of Lanterns’’ in Old China. There was laughter and gaiety in the streets of Old Pekin, but the shadow of disgrace hung over the Palace of the Emperor like a cloud, for he had no Son. The Princess Ming Toy, his only child, was both romantic and unconventional, and heeded not the ancient customs of her country. She decided she would like to ride through the streets of Pekin in her palanquin and view the processions. She did so, and met romance in the guise of Ki Yong. They fell in love. Then war and base treachery plunged the city into chaos, but the Daughter of the Dragon arose, and triumphantly fulfilled her Destiny. But perhaps you would like to hear the full story, so let us slip back through the years, and imagine that we are in the streets of Old Pekin."

== Cast ==
- Marie Bremner as Princess Ming Toy, the Daughter of the Dragon
- Richard Benger as the Emperor of China (singing voice)
- Peter Finch as the Emperor (speaking voice)
